My Way, released in France as Cloclo, is a 2012 French biographical drama film about the life of French singer, songwriter and entertainer Claude François. It is co-written and directed by Florent Emilio Siri, and stars Jérémie Renier as François.

Cloclo refers to François' nickname, while the international name was chosen due to the eponymous song popularized by Frank Sinatra, but originally co-written, co-composed and performed as "Comme d'habitude" by François. The film follows the life of the singer from his childhood in Egypt in the 1940s to his accidental death in 1978.

Cast 
 Jérémie Renier as Claude François
 Benoît Magimel as Paul Lederman
 Monica Scattini as Lucia "Souffa" François
 Sabrina Seyvecou as Josette "Jojo" François
 Ana Girardot as Isabelle Forêt
 Joséphine Japy as France Gall
 Maud Jurez as Janet Woollacot
 Marc Barbé as Aimé François
 Eric Savin as Jean-Jacques Tilche
 Émilie Caen as Geneviève Leroy
 Sophie Meister as Kathalyn Jones
 Janicke Askevold as Sofia
 Pascal Aubert as Eddy Marnay
 Robert Knepper as Frank Sinatra
 Alison Wheeler as Sylvie Mathurin

Reception 
The film received positive reviews from film critics, who praised Renier's performance and Siri's direction. It holds an 83% rating on the film critics aggregate site Rotten Tomatoes based on 6 reviews.

Accolades

References

External links 
 
 

2012 films
Biographical films about singers
2010s French-language films
2012 biographical drama films
2010s historical drama films
Films set in the 1960s
Films set in the 1970s
Belgian biographical drama films
French biographical drama films
Films scored by Alexandre Desplat
Cultural depictions of Frank Sinatra
Cultural depictions of pop musicians
Cultural depictions of French men
Cultural depictions of Egyptian men
StudioCanal films
2010s musical drama films
French musical drama films
Belgian historical drama films
French historical drama films
2012 drama films
French-language Belgian films
2010s French films